Asahan may refer to:

 Asahan Regency, an administrative division of North Sumatra, Indonesia
 Asahan River, a river in Sumatra, Indonesia
 Pekan Asahan, a town in Malacca, Malaysia
 Asahan (state constituency), a constituency represented in the Malacca State Legislative Assembly
 Asahan Sultanate, a Malay sultanate which reigned in what is now Asahan Regency until 1946

See also